Arima marginata is a species of leaf beetles of the subfamily Galerucinae in the family Chrysomelidae.

Subspecies
Subspecies include:
Arima marginata caprai Havelka, 1959 
Arima marginata freyi Havelka, 1959 
Arima marginata heyrovskyi Havelka, 1959 
Arima marginata marginata (Fabricius, 1781) 
Arima marginata obenbergeri Havelka, 1959 
Arima marginata pseudobrachyptera Havelka, 1959

Distribution
This species is only found in the Southeast France and in the Northwestern Italy.

Description
Therefore this species presents a clear sexual dimorphism, as females are generally much larger than males. Moreover females outnumber males.

These beetles are shiny black with orange marginal bands on the edge of the pronotum and the elytra. Elytra cover only two abdominal segments.

Antennae are filiform and the abdomen is voluminous. The last sternites is composed by one piece, in the shape of a ginkgo leaf, while the genital plate is made of two parts. These beetles do not fly, but they are very active.

Biology
Adults of this species can be found from April to August, and have one generation per year (univoltine). Adults overwinter in the ground. Female lays about 80 eggs on the leaves of the host plants, and the larvae come out after about ten days. They are black and highly polyphagous. They mainly feed on the leaves of many aromatic Lamiaceae species (Lavandula, Mentha, Origanum, Salvia, Basil, Thymus'', etc.).

References

External links
 
 
 Lech Borowiec  Chrysomelidae of Europe
 Entomoland
 Les Chrysomeles 

Galerucinae
Beetles described in 1781
Taxa named by Johan Christian Fabricius
Beetles of Europe